is located in Kōchi, Kōchi, Kōchi Prefecture, Japan. It is the only racecourse located in Shikoku.

Physical attributes
Kochi Racecourse has a dirt course.

It is a right-handed course, measuring 1,100 meters.

Notable races

External links
 Official site

References

Horse racing venues in Japan
Sports venues in Kōchi Prefecture
Kōchi
Sports venues completed in 1985
1985 establishments in Japan